Centennial is an inner-city neighbourhood located Winnipeg, Manitoba, Canada, in the Downtown East Neighbourhood Cluster. The boundaries of Centennial are Sherbrook Street on the west, Logan Avenue on the north, William Avenue on the south and Stanley, Paulin and Adelaide streets on the east.

Demographics
In 2006, the population of Centennial was 2,225, which has been on a near-steady drop since 1971 when the population was 3,510. Centennial does not have a majority racial group as it is 26.3% White, 44.7% Aboriginal and 29.0% is made up of visible minorities; 12.1% Southeast Asian, 9.4% Black, 5.2% East Asian and the rest of other groups.

Centennial is a lower income neighbourhood, with a median household income of $15,206, which is ess than one-third of the city's at $49,790. There are 910 dwellings, 20.9% which are owned and the average dwelling is worth $53,440. 18.6% of these dwellings are in need of major repairs.

Crime
Centennial has very high crime rates, violent crimes specifically. There were 11 homicides in the area from 2012 to 2016. In 2016, there were 36 robberies (1618.0 per 100,000 residents), 23 auto-thefts (629.2), 46 break-ins (2067.4) and 21 shootings (224.7). All of these rates are not only significantly higher than the national rates, but much higher than the city-wide rates. The robbery rate is more than 20 times the national rate (79 per 100,000 residents) and the 9th highest of all the neighborhoods in Winnipeg with populations over 1,000 residents, 15th (of 234) in total.

Points of interest

Schools
 Dufferin School
 Red River College - Roblin Centre

Parks and playgrounds
 Dufferin Park
 Dufferin and Isabel park
 Lizzie Playground
 Ross Ellen Playground
 Roosevelt Playground
 Pacific Avenue Tot Lot
 Ellen and Pacific Tot Lot
 Central Park
 Freight House Outdoor Pool

Places of religion
 Vietnamese Mennonite Church
 Believers Church
 Amazing Grace Ministry

References

Neighbourhoods in Winnipeg